Megachile erimae is a species of bee in the family Megachilidae. It was described by Mocsáry in 1899.

References

Erimae
Insects described in 1899